North American Indian childhood cirrhosis (NAIC) is a disease in humans that can affect Ojibway-Cree children in northwestern Quebec, Canada. The disease is due to an autosomal recessive abnormality of the UTP4 gene, which codes for cirhin.

NAIC is a ribosomopathy. An R565W mutation of UTP4 leads to partial impairment of cirhin interaction with NOL11.

Initial transient neonatal jaundice advances over time to biliary cirrhosis with severe liver fibrosis. Eventually, liver failure occurs, and requires liver transplantation.

See also
 Indian childhood cirrhosis

References
 North American Indian childhood cirrhosis on Genetics Home Reference

Autosomal recessive disorders
Diseases of liver
Ribosomopathy